JBW may refer to:
 JBW, a British racing car manufacturer
 JBW algebra, a type of algebra over a field 
 Johnson Boat Works, an American racing boat manufacturer
 jbw, the ISO 639-3 language code for the Yawijibaya language